Evergreen High School is a public high school that is located in Vancouver, Washington. It was founded shortly after the district was formed in 1945, and Evergreen High school was the first high school in the Evergreen Public Schools school district.

Facilities
Evergreen High School is located on a large plot of land that it shares with Cascade Middle School, Legacy High School (an alternative education facility), Burton Elementary School, McKenzie Stadium, and the school district warehouse and bus barn. Evergreen was originally built at the corner of 18th Street and 137th Avenue. When the current building was constructed in the 1970s on the east side of the parcel, Cascade Junior High (now Middle School) was opened in the original building. The aging, original building was demolished in the summer of 2004 after the completion of Cascade's new abutting campus to the north. The original site is now a multi-use sports field.

Evergreen band
Evergreen boasts an award-winning Concert Band, Jazz Band, Marching Band program. The band is currently directed by Jarod Sorum and Craig Gustafson. In 2008 the marching band was invited to play at the make-a-wish Presidential Inauguration parade for Barack Obama. 
With a long tradition of excellent marching bands, Evergreen High School has won more than 250 trophies and awards in the past, for both field and parade marching. Some of the most noteworthy performances include the Portland Rose Parade, the premiere parade in the Northwest. source 
More information about the Evergreen Marching Band and color guard at their website EHSboosters.org.
Most recently the Evergreen Wind Ensemble performed at the Music For All National Concert Band Festival in Indianapolis, Indiana.

Evergreen Choir
Evergreen High School choir is currently directed by Ms. Margret Green. Their advanced choirs; Chamber choir, Advanced Women's choir, and Concert choir all went to Anaheim, California. All of them won third place in their categories.

World languages

Evergreen offers ASL, French and  Spanish Classes. The language teachers were applied for, and received a literacy grant from the district focusing on proficiency grading and literature analysis.

Athletics
Evergreen competes in, 3A (WIAA).  They are a member of the Greater St. Helens 3A league.

In 2004, EHS football team became the first 4A team from the Southwest Washington District IV to make a state championship game. After falling behind early 14-0 to Skyline Spartans, the Plainsmen won 28-14 . Running back Taylor Rank stood out for the Plainsmen, carrying the ball 28 times for 211 yards and three touchdowns. Rank played football at the University of South Carolina until graduation in 2009.

2009 graduate Kyrell Hudson was drafted by the Philadelphia Phillies in the third round of the 2009 MLB Draft.

State championships
 Boys Basketball: 1995
 Boys Wrestling: 1997
 Football: 2004
 Girls Bowling: 2017-2020

State runners-up
 Boys Soccer: 1999
 Girls Bowling: 2016

Notable alumni
Shalon Baker a former Canadian Football League and Arena Football League player
Brandon Cantu, two-time World Series of Poker bracelet winner
Robert Franks, current NBA player (Charlotte Hornets)
Randy Myers, former Baseball player (New York Mets, Cincinnati Reds, and other teams)
Greg Peach, current Canadian Football League player of the Hamilton Tiger-Cats
Treva Throneberry, a con artist who masqueraded as a high school student under the name Brianna Stewart
Staci Doucette, a four-time All-American softball player at Linfield College. Doucette holds two Division III records, for career home runs and career RBIs.

Teacher misconduct
On June 22, 2018, former vice principal Sadie Pritchard was arrested and accused of having sexual relations with an underage student.

Former drama teacher Stephanie McCrea sentenced to five years in prison for having sex with a 15-year-old

Former teacher Matthew Morasch convicted of trying to take upskirt pictures of a 16-year-old

References

External links
Evergreen High School website
- Evergreen High School
Marching Band webpage
Theatre Webpage

High schools in Vancouver, Washington
Public high schools in Washington (state)